Her Master's Voice was a 1933 Broadway two act comedy written by Clare Kummer, 
produced by Max Gordon and staged by C. Worthington Miner with scenic design created by Raymond Sovey. Roland Young, who played Ned Farrar, was Clare Kummer's son-in-law at the time. The play ran for 224 performances from October 23, 1933 to May 1934 at the Plymouth Theatre.

The play was included in Burns Mantle's The Best Plays of 1933-1934.

Cast
 Roland Young as Ned Farrar	
 Frances Fuller as	Queena Farrar	
 Laura Hope Crews as Aunt Min 	
 Elizabeth Patterson as Mrs. Martin	
 Francis Pierlot as Craddock	
 Frederick Perry as Mr. Twilling
 Josephine Williams as	Phoebe

Adaptations
The play was presented as a one-hour radio adaptation on Lux Radio Theatre on March 17, 1935. Roland Young reprised his leading role.

It was adapted into the 1936 film Her Master's Voice directed by Joseph Santley and starring 
Edward Everett Horton and Peggy Conklin with Laura Hope Crews recreating her role as Aunt Min.

References

External links 
 

1933 plays
Broadway plays
Plays set in New Jersey
American plays adapted into films
Comedy plays